Charles Bindley (1795/6–1859) was a British sporting writer, who concentrated on horses and field sports, particularly hunting and stable management. He became known under his pseudonym, Harry Hieover.

Life
On his own account, Bindley's background included a fox-hunting father, service in Ireland, and sojourns mainly in Leicestershire and Lincolnshire. He wrote for a number of major sporting periodicals. In November 1858, in poor health, he left London for Brighton, where he was the guest of his friend Sir Thomas Barrett-Lennard, 2nd Baronet. He died there on 10 February 1859, aged 63.

Works
Bindley published:

 Stable Talk and Table Talk, or Spectacles for Young Sportsmen, 2 vols. 1845–6
 The Pocket and the Stud, or Practical Hints for the Management of the Stable, 1848
 The Stud for Practical Purposes and Practical Men, 1849
 Practical Horsemanship, 1850
 The Hunting Field, 1850 
 editor, Delabere Blaine's Encyclopædia of Rural Sports (1852) 
 Bipeds and Quadrupeds, 1853
 Sporting Facts and Sporting Fancies, 1853
 The World: How to square it, 1854
 Hints to Horsemen: Shewing how to make Money by Horses, 1856
 Precept and Practice, 1857, reprinted articles from The Field
 The Sporting World, 1858 
 Things worth knowing about Horses, 1859.

For Bentley's Miscellany Bindley wrote a fiction series, "The Two Mr. Smiths, or the Double Mistake".

Notes

External links
Online Books page

Attribution

1795 births
1859 deaths
English writers
English journalists